Mohamed Sanni-Thomas (11 August 1927 – 3 February 2007) was a Ghanaian middle-distance runner. He competed in the men's 800 metres at the 1952 Summer Olympics.

References

1927 births
2007 deaths
Athletes (track and field) at the 1952 Summer Olympics
Ghanaian male middle-distance runners
Olympic athletes of Ghana
Place of birth missing